María Thelma Smáradóttir (born 22 January 1993) is an Icelandic stage and film actress. In 2018, she appeared in the film Arctic alongside Mads Mikkelsen.

Career
María graduated from the Iceland Academy of the Arts in 2016. Shortly later, she appeared in the TV Mini-Series Prisoners. In 2018, she appeared alongside Mads Mikkelsen in the film Arctic directed by Joe Penna.

In 2019, she premiered her theater play named Welcome home in the National Theatre of Iceland. where her show is sold out twice a week.

Filmography 
 Svartur á leik (2012) 
 Arctic (2018)

Television 
 Prisoners (2017)
 Who killed Friðrik Dór (2021)
 Trapped (2021)

Theater 
 Risaeðlurnar (2017)
 Welcome home (2019)

References

External links

Living people
1993 births
Maria Thelma Smaradottir
Maria Thelma Smaradottir